Li Hongzhi published the Teachings of Falun Gong in Changchun, China in 1992. They cover a wide range of topics ranging from spiritual, scientific and moral to metaphysical.

The teachings of Falun Gong are based on the principles of zhēn 眞, shàn 善 and rěn 忍 (which translate approximately as truthfulness, benevolence, and forbearance) articulated in the two main books Falun Gong and Zhuan Falun. Falun Gong is an introductory book that discusses qigong, introduces the aforementioned principles, and provides illustrations and explanations of exercises for meditation. Zhuan Falun is considered the central and most comprehensive exposition on the teachings of Falun Gong. It promises that its practitioners can attain supernatural powers.

According to the book Falun Gong, "Fǎlún" (Buddha Fǎ) is a great, high-level cultivation way of the Buddha School (different from Buddhism), in which assimilation to the supreme nature of the universe, Zhen-Shan-Ren, is the foundation of cultivation practice." In this concept, "cultivation" refers to upgrading one's xīnxìng (mind-nature) through abandoning negative attachments and assimilating oneself to "Truthfulness-Compassion-Forbearance". "Practice" refers to the five meditative exercises that are said to purify and transform one's body. Cultivation is considered essential, and the exercises are said to supplement the process of improving oneself.

Falun Gong's conservative and moralistic views on subjects such as sexuality have attracted controversy.

Influences
See also Theoretical background and History of Falun Gong

Buddhism and Daoism
The teachings of Falun Gong makes a distinction between fojia, Buddha School, and fojiao, the religion of Buddhism and also the Dao School (daojia) and the religion of Daoism (daojiao). Li Hongzhi states that there are two main systems of Xiu Lian or Cultivation practice: the "Buddha School" and the "Dao School". According to Li, Cultivation ways of the Buddha School focus on cultivation of Compassion while the Dao School lays emphasis on cultivation of Truthfulness. In Falun Gong, Truthfulness and Compassion are apparently understood to be aspects of the cosmos's fundamental nature, Zhen-Shan-Ren, translated approximately as Truthfulness, Compassion and Forbearance, each of which are said to further unfold into Zhen-Shan-Ren. Thus, cultivation practices whether in the Buddha School or Dao School are considered a process of assimilation to this cosmic characteristic. Li states that there are many cultivation ways in the Dao and Buddha schools which are unrelated to secular religions and are often handed down from Master to disciple in secret or "has always been practiced quietly, either among the populace or deep in the mountains." Li states that "These kinds of practices have their uniqueness. They need to choose a good disciple—someone with tremendous virtue who is truly capable of cultivating to an advanced level."

In the book Falun Gong, Li states that Falun Gong is Buddhist qigong and an upright cultivation way, that has nothing to do with the religion of Buddhism, despite the fact that they have different approaches but the same goal in cultivation.

Li states that the religion of Buddhism "is a system of cultivation that Shakyamuni awakened to in India more than two thousand years ago when he was cultivating."

In Falun Gong, as in Buddhism or Daoism, practitioners are required to gradually let go of negative attachments. According to David Ownby, the requirement in Falun Gong to abandon human attachments is not for achieving selfish ends, but "quite the contrary. Practitioners are enjoined to treat others with compassion and benevolence in order to cultivate virtue and work off karma." He says that such compassion and benevolence should not be reserved to those with whom one had a prior attachment, nor should the goal be to inspire gratitude or love, but for conformity to the nature of the universe. Li also insists that practitioners do not withdraw from the world, and that they maintain interactions with non-practitioners, including "even those who are hostile to practice". The point here, according to Ownby, is that before the practitioner cultivates to such a point that they are dispassionate in their compassion, the stress experienced in the secular environment "constitutes a form of suffering which will enable them to reduce their karma".

Stephen Chan, writing in the international relations journal Global Society, suggests that in providing a metaphysical system which relates the life of man with the greater cosmos, Falun Gong presents a philosophy which in a sense bypasses the communist-atheist ideology of Chinese state. He suggests that this may have led to the decision of a ban made by the Chinese authorities. Chan writes that Falun Gong poses no political threat to the Chinese government, and there is no deliberate political agenda within the Falun doctrine. He concludes that Falun Gong is banned not because of the doctrines, but simply because Falun Gong is outside of the communist apparatus.

Chan draws parallels between Falun Gong and Buddhism, in saying that the two share a central doctrine on goodness and unconditional compassion towards others. Chan also provides a point of differentiation between Falun Gong and Buddhism. Penny writes that another one of Li Hongzhi's critiques of Buddhism is that the original form of Buddhism, Sakyamuni's Buddhism, was somehow pure, it has declined over the centuries through the intervention of a degenerate priesthood, thus distorting the Buddhist Dharma. Falun Gong teaches the essential elevation of good as a governing norm, where good creates the society, although in a conservative way.

According to Ownby, the "moral qualities cultivators are enjoined to practice in their own lives [are] truth, compassion and forbearance", and are the three central pillars of Falun Gong. Li taught that the goal of cultivation is one of spiritual elevation, achieved by "eliminating karma—the built-up sins of past and present lives which often manifest themselves in individuals as illness—and accumulating virtue". Through cultivation, Falun Gong "promised personal harmony with the very substance of the universe". In line with Falun Gong's consistent allusions to Oriental traditions, Li criticized the "self-imposed limits" of modern science, and viewed traditional Chinese science as an entirely different, yet equally valid knowledge system. Yet he also borrowed from modern scientific ideas to represent part of the Falun Gong doctrine—notably by making references to atomic theory and nuclear energy. By introducing scientific elements into his teachings, Li hoped to avoid Falun Gong being characterized as a traditional, superstitious belief system, and to gain a wider following among the educated.Zhao, Yuezhi, "Falun Gong, Identity, and the Struggle over Meaning Inside and Outside China", pp. 209–23 in Contesting Media Power: Alternative Media in a Networked World, ed. Nick Couldry and James Curran, Rowman & Littlefield: 2003. New Zealand scholar Heather Kavan wrote that the principles of "truthfulness, compassion, forbearance" have been repeated by Falun Gong members to outsiders as a tactic for evading deeper inquiry. Kavan said that Li instructed his followers to lie about Falun Gong to outsiders.

China scholar Benjamin Penny's 2005 publication The Falun Gong, Buddhism and "Buddhist qigong" points out that after the crackdown, the Chinese Buddhist Association was eager to denounce Falun Gong, and other Buddhist groups followed suit in fear of persecution. He also points out that the Buddhist community's response to Falun Gong could also have been due in part to Falun Gong's rapid growth in China. According to Penny, Li tells that the features of the Buddha School include the cultivation of Buddhahood and the belief in predestined relationships, which are included in the teachings of Falun Gong.

Maria Chang believes that Li's teaching on the "Dharma-ending period", and his remarks about providing salvation "in the final period of the Last Havoc", are apocalyptic. Penny dissuades from considering Falun Gong as one of "these genuinely apocalyptic groups", and says that Li Hongzhi's teachings ought to be considered in the context of a "much more Buddhist notion of the cycle of the Dharma or the Buddhist law".

QigongQigong refers to a variety of traditional cultivation practices that involve movements or regulated breathing. Qigong may be practiced for improving health, as a medical profession, a spiritual path, or as a component of Chinese martial arts.

The term qigong was coined in the early 1950s as an alternative label to ancient spiritual disciplines rooted in Buddhism or Taoism, that promoted the belief in the supernatural, immortality and pursuit of spiritual transcendence. The new term was constructed to avoid danger of association with ancient spiritual practices that were labeled "superstitious" and persecuted during the Maoist era. In Communist China, where spirituality and religion are looked-down upon, the concept was "tolerated" because it carried with it no overt religious or spiritual elements; and millions flocked to it during China's spiritual vacuum of the 1980s and 1990s. Scholars argue that the immense popularity of qigong in China could, in part, lie in the fact that the public saw in it a way to improve and maintain health. According to Ownby, this rapidly became a social phenomenon of considerable importance.

In 1992, Li Hongzhi introduced Falun Gong, along with teachings that touched upon a wide range of topics, from detailed exposition on qigong related phenomenon and cultivation practice to science and morality. In the next few years, Falun Gong quickly grew in popularity across China. Falun Gong was welcomed into the state-controlled Scientific Qigong Research Association, which sponsored and helped to organize many of his activities between 1992 and 1994, including 54 large-scale lectures. In 1992 and 1993, he won government awards at the Beijing Oriental Health Expos, including the "Qigong Master most acclaimed by the Masses" and "The Award for Advancing Boundary Science".Clearwisdom.net, Awards and Recognitions

The content of Li Hongzhi's books include commentaries on questions discussed in China's qigong community for ages. According to Ownby, Li saw the qigong movement as "rife with false teachings and greedy and fraudulent 'masters'" and set out to rectify it. Li understood himself and Falun Gong as part of a "centuries-old tradition of cultivation", and in his texts would often attack those who taught "incorrect, deviant, or heterodox ways". Qigong scholar David Palmer says Li "redefined his method as having entirely different objectives from qigong: the purpose of practice should neither be physical health nor the development of Extraordinary Powers, but to purify one's heart and attain spiritual salvation...Falun Gong no longer presented itself as a qigong method but as the Great Law or Dharma (Fa) of the universe."

In one of his lectures, Li Hongzhi stated that Dafa can enable people to ascend to high levels in the process of cultivation.

Both its popular name, Falun Gong, and its preferred name, Falun Dafa, highlight its practical and spiritual dimensions, according to Zhao. Falun Gong literally means "Practice of the Law Wheel (Dharma Chakra)" which refers to a series of five meditative exercises aimed at channeling and harmonizing the qi or vital energy. Theories about the flow and function of qi are basic to traditional Chinese medicine and health-enhancing qigong exercises. Zhao says that traditional Chinese culture assumes "a profound interpretation of matter and spirit, body and soul", and Falun Gong "emphasizes the unity of physical and spiritual healing, in contrast to the Western distinction between medicine and religion". To bring about health benefits, the physical exercises must be accompanied by moral cultivation and spiritual exercises as a way of focusing the mind. For Falun Gong, the virtues to cultivate are "truthfulness", "benevolence" and "forbearance".

Falun Gong draws on oriental mysticism and traditional Chinese medicine, criticizes self-imposed limits of modern science, and views traditional Chinese science as an entirely different, yet equally valid knowledge system. Concomitantly, says Zhao, it borrows the language of modern science in representing its cosmic laws. According to Zhao, "Falun gong is not conceptualized as a religious faith; on the contrary, its practitioners, who include doctorate holders from prestigious American universities, see it as 'a new form of science.'"

Prominent Falun Gong scholar David Ownby delineates three core themes in the teachings: first, "Li presents his vision both as a return to a lost, or neglected spiritual tradition, and as a major contribution to modern science"; second, "Falun Gong is profoundly moral"; third, "Falun Dafa promises practitioners supernatural powers". Ownby also lists its "Chineseness" as a major part of the practice's appeal.

All over China before July 1999, says Palmer, the same scene could be observed at dawn: "Hundreds of people in the parks and on the sidewalks, practising the slow-motion Falun Gong exercises to the rhythm of taped music ... yellow and red Fa banners hanging from trees presented the method and its principles. In the evenings practitioners would often meet in a disciple's home to read Zhuan Falun, discuss its teachings, and exchange cultivation experiences."

Cultivation
From the beginning, Li has asserted his absolute authority over the transmission of the teachings and the use of healing powers of Falun Gong: he said in Changchun that only he is possessed of these right, and any who violate are to be expelled. Li said that it is a violation of Dafa to treat other people's illnesses or invite others to come to a practice point to be treated. If such that happens, then the violator is not considered by Li to be his disciple. He calls on his disciples to replace assistants who violate the commandment. Also, Li wrote in Zhuan Falun prohibiting his followers charging fees for workshops, saying that if they do so, "his dharma bodies will take away everything that they have, so that they will no longer belong to Falun Dafa, and what they teach will not be Falun Dafa."

Li Hongzhi describes Falun Gong as a "high-level cultivation practice" which, in the past, "served as an intensive cultivation method that required practitioners with extremely high Xinxing (mind-nature) or great inborn quality"; he teaches that practice will reveal the principles of the universe and life at different levels to those who dedicate themselves to its study. By cultivating xinxing to assimilate to the nature of the universe, and by eliminating karma though enduring tribulations and hardships, one can return to the "original, true self", and understand the truth of human life. In Falun Dafa, Truthfulness (Zhen 真), Compassion (Shan 善), Forbearance (Ren 忍) is seen as the fundamental characteristic of the cosmos, and the process of cultivation, one of the practitioner assimilating himself to this by letting go of attachments and negative thoughts. In Zhuan Falun, Li Hongzhi says that if one assimilates oneself to the characteristic as a practitioner, then that person has attained the Tao.

Falun Gong echoes traditional Chinese beliefs that humans are connected to the universe through mind and body, according to Danny Schechter. Li challenges "conventional mentalities", and sets out to unveil myths of the universe, time-space, and the human body.

Li says that raising one's xinxing is fundamental to cultivating oneself. Improving xinxing means relinquishing human attachments and notions, which prevent people from awakening. The term attachment can refer to jealousy, competitiveness, fame, showing off, pursuit of material gain, anger, lust and similar traits. In Zhuan Falun, he states that ill thoughts among everyday people must be eliminated—only then can one move up.

Li argues that having material possessions itself is not a problem, but that the problem is with developing attachments to material things. Ownby says that for Li Hongzhi, an attachment is "literally any desire, emotion, habit, or orientation which stands between a practitioner (or any human being for that matter) and the pursuit of truth and cultivation". At the beginning of Zhuan Falun Li says that the process of cultivation "is one of constantly giving up human attachments", such as competition, deception, and harm for even a little personal gain.

Li also says that loss and gain does not refer to the loss of money or the gain of comfort, rather the measure of how many human attachments one can lose, and how much one can enlighten in the course of cultivation practice.

Ownby regards as most difficult to practice Li's requirement for practitioners to reduce the attachment to sentimentality or qing (情). In Lecture Four of Zhuan Falun Li says that human beings can be human on account of sentimentality, and they live just for it. In order to succeed in cultivation practice, sentimentality must be given up. Ownby regards this as "quite Buddhist, as it is a way out of the web of human relations...and thus a step toward individual enlightenment".

Ownby says that Li urges practitioners to abandon human attachments not for achieving selfish ends, but "quite the contrary. Practitioners are enjoined to treat others with compassion and benevolence in order to cultivate virtue and work off karma." He says that such compassion and benevolence should not be reserved to those with whom one had a prior attachment, nor should the goal be to inspire gratitude or love; instead, it's "to conform to the nature of the universe". Li also insists that practitioners do not withdraw from the world, and that they maintain interactions with non-practitioners, including "even those who are hostile to practice". The point here, according to Ownby, is that before the practitioner cultivates to such a point that they are dispassionate in their compassion, the stress experienced in the secular environment "constitutes a form of suffering which will enable them to reduce their karma".

Such aforementioned statements could be traceable to the Qur'anic phrase "God loves those who purify themselves" (9:108).

Li states that to practice cultivation one must be considerate of others in all circumstances and always search within for the cause when encountering tribulations.

Zhuan Falun, the main book
The teachings of Falun Gong are encompassed in two central works: Falun Gong and Zhuan Falun:Falun Gong is an introductory book that discusses qigong, introduces the principles of the practice, and provides illustrations and explanations of the exercises.Zhuan Falun is the main teaching and the most comprehensive work; it is an edited version of Li's nine-lecture series, 54 of which he taught across China between 1992 and 1994.

Ownby regards Falun Gong and Zhuan Falun to be largely consistent in terms of content, though he says "important differences in nuance distinguish the two". The World Book encyclopedia describes the contents of Zhuan Falun as examining "evolution, the meaning of space and time, and the mysteries of the universe". Penny commented in 2003 "after Falun Gong's ban in mainland China in 1999, new editions of Falun Gong's books no longer contain biographies of Li. These changes seem to reflect a larger trend of Li retreating from the public eye. Since 2000 he has very rarely appeared in public, his presence almost entirely being electronic or re-routed through quotations on Falun Gong's websites.Li Hongzhi's biography were removed from Falun Gong websites some time after 2001". Kavan noted in July 2008 that the English translation of part of the text (Zhuan Falun volume II) was not offered on-line. It would seem that the missing translation was published online in June 2008 as "volume II".

In a 1996 Lecture in Sydney, referring to the work Zhuan Falun, Li stated that he wrote the book to explain qigong and its ultimate goal, certain phenomena in the Qigong community, and why Qigong is spread in ordinary human society.

Li says constant study will lead the practitioner to the final goal of "Consummation", or enlightenment. He says that by reading Zhuan Falun repeatedly, and acting according to its principles, practitioners assimilate themselves to the fundamental characteristic of the universe: Zhen 真, Shan 善 and Ren 忍, "Truthfulness-Compassion-Forbearance".Topics Zhuan Falun expounds on include: Zhen 真, Shan 善 Ren 忍 is the Sole Criterion to Discern Good and Bad People, Buddha School Qigong and Buddhism, Supernormal Abilities, Loss and Gain, Transformation of Karma, Upgrading Xinxing (Mind nature and moral quality), Cultivation of Mind and Body, Cultivation of Speech, The Issue of Eating Meat, The Issue of Treating Illness, Qi Gong and Physical Exercises, Enlightenment etc.

Since 1992, Li has given Falun Gong lectures that have been transcribed and posted to the internet. He emphasizes that Zhuan Falun should be viewed as the main guide for cultivation practice. In 2007 he said this recent lectures are supplementary to Zhuan Falun, and that Zhuan Falun should be studied frequently."

Zhen 真, Shan 善, Ren 忍
Falun Gong states that the fundamental characteristic of the universe is Zhen 真, Shan 善 Ren 忍, or "Truthfulness-Compassion-Forbearance". In Zhuan Falun Li says that the characteristic, Zhen-Shan-Ren, is in the microscopic particles of air, rock, wood, soil, iron and steel, the human body, as well as in all matter. "In ancient times it was said that the Five Elements constitute all things and matter in the universe; they also carry this characteristic, Zhen-Shan-Ren."

Ownby refers to Li's discussion of the moral universe, where "The very structure of the universe, according to Li Hongzhi, is made up of moral qualities that cultivators are enjoined to practice in their own lives: truth, compassion and forbearance. The goal of cultivation, and hence of life itself, is spiritual elevation, achieved through eliminating negative karma...and accumulating virtue."

Li teaches that practitioners are to assimilate their thoughts and actions to these principles, wherein higher aspects of the mysteries of the universe and life will be revealed: "A practitioner can only understand the specific manifestation of the Buddha Fa at the level that his or her cultivation has reached, which is his or her cultivation Fruit Status and level."

Practice

The term practice refers to the five exercises, one of which is a sitting meditation. In the book Falun Gong, Li Hongzhi explains the principles behind the exercises.

He says the exercises are part of the "harmonization and perfection" in the practice, and what make it a "comprehensive mind-body cultivation system". Li says that though Falun Gong requires both cultivation and practice, cultivation of xinxing is actually more important. However, "A person who only cultivates his xinxing and does not perform the exercises of the Great Consummation Way will find the growth of his gong potency impeded and his original-body (benti) unchanged."

The First Exercise: Buddha Showing a Thousand Hands:
This exercise involves stretching movements which are aimed at "open[ing] up all energy channels" in one's body. In Falun Gong, Li states that "beginners will be able to acquire energy in a short period of time and experienced practitioners can quickly improve." It is said to "break through areas where the energy is blocked, to enable energy to circulate freely and smoothly, to mobilize the energy within the body and under the skin, circulating it vigorously, and to absorb a great amount of energy from the universe". It is composed of eight movements.

The Second Exercise: Falun Standing Stance:
This exercise is a tranquil standing meditation composed of four standing stances.

The Third Exercise: Penetrating the Two Cosmic Extremes:
The aim of this exercise, as stated in Falun Gong, is "to penetrate the cosmic energy and mix it with the energy inside of one's body", in order to "reach the state of 'a Pure-White Body' quickly".

The Fourth Exercise: Falun Heavenly Circuit:Falun Gong says the fourth exercise is "intermediate-level" and is on the basis of the previous three sets of exercises. Li says the most outstanding feature of this exercise is "to use the rotation of Falun to rectify all the abnormal conditions of the human body, so that the human body, the small cosmos, returns to its original state and the energy of the whole body can circulate freely and smoothly".

The Fifth Exercise: Strengthening Divine Powers:
The fifth exercise of intermediate-level has a set of Buddha Mudras or Buddhist Hand Gestures that precede tranquil meditation.

Teleology of practice

In Zhuan Falun Li says that human life is not created in ordinary human society, but "in the space of the universe". He says that the universe is benevolent to begin with, and "embodies the characteristic of Zhen-Shan-Ren". When a life is created, it is assimilated to the characteristic of the universe. However, eventually a web of relations developed, and selfishness came about; gradually the level of beings' was lowered until, in the end, they reached this level of human beings. Li says in his book that the purpose of being human is to practice cultivation and return to the "original, true self".

Ownby interprets Li's meaning as "humans were originally gods of some sort, who lost their status as life became 'complicated' (a word with more negative connotations in Chinese than in English) and they engaged in immoral behavior. Presumably, humans can redeem themselves through cultivation and regain their divine status."

Li teaches maintaining virtue in everyday life, by cultivating or improving xinxing through slowly acknowledging and discarding human desires and attachments.Transformation of Karma, Zhuan Falun Lecture 4, accessed 01/01/08 A practitioner must also be able to endure hardships and tribulations to reduce karma, which Li says is a negative, black substance that blocks people from enlightening to spiritual truths. Its opposite, virtue, is said to be a white substance gained by doing good deeds and forbearing through hardships. Li teaches that virtue may be transformed into gong, or "cultivation energy", which is said to be an everlasting, fundamental energy a human spirit possesses, and what ultimately dictates where the spirit goes after death.

Li states that an important aspect of his system is its cultivation of the Main Spirit. He says that a person is made up of a Primordial Spirit, which could be composed of one's Main Spirit and one or more Assistant Spirits. Li states that the Main Spirit is the part of one's consciousness that one perceives as one's own self, and is the spirit that humans must cultivate to ascend to higher levels. A person can also have one or more Assistant spirits. Zhuan Falun says that upon death, both spirits split from the body and go their own ways. In practices that cultivate the Assistant Spirit, the Assistant Spirit will reincarnate into another body to continue cultivating, whereas the Main Spirit, which is the person themselves, will be left with nothing and upon reincarnation will not remember its past. It will be left to live locked in the human dimension, in delusion. Li also teaches that practices that teach trance, mantras, and visualization, only focus on the Assistant Spirit.

Li says that his teaching offers a chance for humans to return to their original, true selves, and he calls this "salvation of all beings".

Some scholars suggest that Li Hongzhi assumes the role of a supernatural entity within the teachings of Falun Gong: Maria Hsia Chang, for example, opines that "If Li Hongzhi's disciples can become gods by engaging in Falun Gong, it stands to reason that the founder of this cultivation practice must himself be a deity." However, Ian Johnson suggests that Li emphasises his teachings as simple revelations of "eternal truths", known since time immemorial but which have been corrupted over the course of time. Johnson opines that Li does not claim to be a messiah or god, but "only a wise teacher who has seen the light" Li said in 2004 that it "doesn't matter if [people] believe in him or not." He hasn't said that he is a god or a Buddha, and that ordinary people can take him to be an average, common man.

On science
David Ownby writes that one of Li Hongzhi's "favorite themes" of discussion involves modern science. He says that Li often "returns to the limitations of the scientific paradigm and the blind arrogance of the world scientific community", at the same time without imparting an explicitly antiscientific or antimodern message. Without the internet for example, Ownby opines, "Falun Gong most certainly would not have achieved its present form." Instead, Li's teaching is directed toward attempting to show that "Falun Gong offers the sole avenue toward genuine understanding of the true meaning of the universe, which he often labels the 'Buddha Fa'."

Li Hongzhi teaches that aliens introduced science into the world with the ill intention to use human bodies.

In a 1999 Time interview, Li warned that modern science is destroying mankind. He said that, in the future, human limbs will become deformed, and internal organs will be impaired. Falun Dafa materials describe a two-billion-year-old nuclear reactor in Africa, claimed to be an artifact of an advanced ancient civilization. The reactor is said to disprove Darwin's theory of evolution.

Ownby says his fieldwork demonstrates that Li's discussions of and challenges to modern science struck a chord with many Chinese intellectuals who took up Falun Gong practice. They say that in explaining the relationship of science "to larger cosmic structures and existential questions",  Li has made science more relevant than before. Li's ultimate aim in talking about science is to "illustrate the limitations of scientific knowledge so as to make space for his own vision, which transcends science and returns it to a secondary, subservient role in our understanding of cosmic and human forces." He attempts to do this with a number of strategies, Ownby says, including purported evidence from "parascientific research". This includes claims of archaeological findings from hundreds of millions of years ago which undermine the theory of evolution. Li suggests, Ownby says, that "scientific paradigms are historically and culturally bound and thus epistemologically incapable of validating their own claims to authority".

Ownby says that according to Li, one of science's major shortcomings is its inability to understand the idea of multiple dimensions - that the universe exists at "many different levels simultaneously and that the process of enlightenment consists of passing through these levels to arrive at ever more complete understandings". Li tells his disciples in Falun Buddha Fa: Lectures in the United States about the complexity of the cosmos.

Ownby says that overall Li's discussion on the topic is simple, and attempts to sum up it up:

"He invokes apparent anomalies in the archaeological or geological record to call into question the authority of the scientific consensus. On the basis of that challenge...he goes on to suggest a less human-centred view of the universe composed of hierarchically linked levels...Through cultivation, humans can transcend the level into which they were born."

Ownby regards Li's arguments as unconvincing, and believes that Li is not particularly interested in scientific debate, or in those who do not believe or who doubt him: "his concern is rather to illustrate, to those who are attracted to such a message, that Falun Dafa both contains within it and transcends the modern scientific viewpoint."

Elise Thomas of the Institute for Strategic Dialogue and Ming Xia of the Graduate Center of the City University of New York said that Falun Gong has a history of rejecting modern medicine. The belief that following Falun Gong's teaching can prevent ailments instead of using medicine is common among the movement's practitioners. Ben Hurley, a former Falun Gong practitioner and staffer at the Falun Gong-associated newspaper The Epoch Times, said: "Many ex-believers know many people that have died from treatable conditions. It's their belief that they don't need medicine, because they're super human beings."

On race
Li Hongzhi teaches that extraterrestrial beings are getting different human races to mix as part of a plan to overtake humankind, and suggests that paradises are racially segregated. Li in "Teaching the Fa at the Conference in Switzerland" says that:

"The way alien beings get human beings to shake free of the gods is to mix the races, causing human beings to become rootless people, just like the plant hybrids people make nowadays. South Americans, Central Americans, Mexicans and some people in South East Asia—all of these races have been mixed. None of this can evade the gods’ eyes. Alien beings have made rather extensive preparations for overtaking human beings."

Transformation and higher dimensions

Connected with Li's discussion of cultivation practice is the idea of "supernormal abilities" and "special powers" that the adherent is supposed to develop in the course of dedicated study. These are connected to Li's teachings on apparent higher-dimensional realities, which he says exist simultaneously and in parallel to the human dimension. Li teaches that supernormal powers are a by-product of moral transcendence, and are never sought after or to be employed for selfish intentions.Danny Schechter, Falun Gong's Challenge to China: Spiritual Practice or Evil Cult?, Akashic books: New York, 2001, p. 66 He has said that there are up to 10,000 supernatural powers, though as Ownby points out, has never listed them. Some of those he has discussed include the opening of the celestial eye, "which may enable practitioners to see into other spatial dimensions and/or through walls" according to Ownby, clairvoyance, precognition, levitation, and "the ability to transform one kind of object into another kind of object" according to Penny, among others.

Penny says the practitioner is supposed to pass through various levels until he or she reaches the state of "cultivation of a Buddha's body".

David Ownby says that Li regards his discussion of multiple dimensions as a superior approach to knowledge and understanding. One of science's major shortcomings, according to Li, is its inability to detect multiple dimensions. "Li argues that the universe—and human understanding of the universe—exists at many different levels simultaneously and that the process of enlightenment consists of passing through these levels to arrive at ever more complete understandings." In this context, transformation is both physical and intellectual. The motor behind such transformation is individual moral practice, alongside cultivation under an orthodox master. Moral practice, says Ownby, is a necessary but not sufficient condition for cultivation and enlightenment. Individual moral practice burns karma and reduces suffering, but unless the individual is committed to an orthodox cultivation regime, they will not be able to break through the various "levels" and attain enlightenment and transformation. "What is required in this instance is a master, someone who has...the power to channel the moral behaviour and intentions of the practitioner in the proper direction." This leads to the oft-repeated phrase in Li's texts: "cultivation depends on oneself, gong depends on the Master".

Richard Madsen, a professor of sociology at the University of California, says "among the Falun Dafa practitioners I have met are Chinese scientists with doctorates from prestigious American universities who claim that modern physics (for example, superstring theory) and biology (specifically the pineal gland's functioning) provide a scientific basis for their beliefs. From their point of view, Falun Dafa is knowledge rather than religion, a new form of science rather than faith."

Maria Hsia Chang regards Li's teachings on these subjects "abstruse". Ownby acknowledges these as challenges to interpreting Li's message, but attempts to place Falun Gong doctrine within its historical and cultural context. Penny says "there are aspects of Falun Gong doctrine that could have been understood by a cultivator in China 1000 years ago," along with some of the teachings, such as those about extraterrestrials, for example, "that could not have appeared in China before the late 1980s". He says this is a "synthesis of age-old traditions and contemporary modes".

Schechter reports a discussion with Falun Gong spokesman Erping Zhang on the subject, when he asked for Zhang's views on "higher consciousness" in this connection. Zhang said: "Higher consciousness is a commonly used term in Eastern cultivation [where] … one can reach a higher level of consciousness via meditation. Higher consciousness may also refer to consciousness beyond this physical dimension. Levitation is a phenomenon or a by-product of one's cultivation of mind and body." The phenomenon of levitation seems also mentioned, in passing, in one of the lectures. Li explains the phenomenon of levitation as being possible because once the human body's matter, which is "related to the Earth and is composed of surface-matter particles", has undergone transformation through cultivation of human-body, "it has severed its connection to the particles in this environment, and hence is no longer restricted by cohesive forces caused by interaction of matter of this particular realm."

Karma and the cycle of rebirth
Falun Gong teaches that the spirit is locked in the cycle of rebirth, also known as samsara due to the accumulation of karma. This is a negative, black substance that accumulates in other dimensions lifetime after lifetime, by doing bad deeds and thinking bad thoughts. Falun Gong states that karma is the reason for suffering, and what ultimately blocks people from the truth of the universe and attaining enlightenment. At the same time, is also the cause of ones continued rebirth and suffering. Li says that due to accumulation of karma the human spirit upon death will reincarnate over and over again, until the karma is paid off or eliminated through cultivation, or the person is destroyed due to the bad deeds he has done.

Ownby regards the concept of karma as a cornerstone to individual moral behaviour in Falun Gong, and also readily traceable to the Christian doctrine of "one reaps what one sows". Ownby says Falun Gong is differentiated by a "system of transmigration" though, "in which each organism is the reincarnation of a previous life form, its current form having been determined by karmic calculation of the moral qualities of the previous lives lived." Ownby says the seeming unfairness of manifest inequities can then be explained, at the same time allowing a space for moral behaviour in spite of them. In the same vein of Li's monism, matter and spirit are one, karma is identified as a black substance which must be purged in the process of cultivation.

Falun Gong differs from Buddhism in its definition of the term "karma", Ownby says, in that it is taken not as a process of award and punishment, but as an exclusively negative term. The Chinese term "de" or "virtue" is reserved for what might otherwise be termed "good karma" in Buddhism. Karma is understood as the source of all suffering - what Buddhism might refer to as "bad karma" or "sinful karma". Li says that the bad things a person has done over his many lifetimes result in misfortune for ordinary people, and karmic obstacles for cultivators, along with birth, aging, sickness, and death.

Ownby regards this as the basis for Falun Gong's apparent "opposition to practitioners' taking medicine when ill; they are missing an opportunity to work off karma by allowing an illness to run its course (suffering depletes karma) or to fight the illness through cultivation." Penny shares this interpretation. Since Li believes that "karma is the primary factor that causes sickness in people", Penny asks: "if disease comes from karma and karma can be eradicated through cultivation of xinxing, then what good will medicine do?" Li himself states that he is not forbidding practitioners from taking medicine, maintaining that "What I'm doing is telling people the relationship between practicing cultivation and medicine-taking". Li also states that "An everyday person needs to take medicine when he gets sick." Schechter quotes a Falun Gong student who says "It is always an individual choice whether one should take medicine or not."

Controversies

Li Hongzhi's conservative moral teachings have caused some concern in the West, including his views on homosexuality, democracy and science. The founder taught that homosexuality makes one "unworthy of being human", creates bad karma, and is comparable to organized crime. He also taught that "disgusting homosexuality shows the dirty abnormal psychology of the gay who has lost his ability of reasoning", and that homosexuality is a "filthy, deviant state of mind." Li additionally stated in a 1998 speech in Switzerland that, "gods' first target of annihilation would be homosexuals." In light of Li's teachings on homosexuality as immoral, a nomination of Li for the Nobel Peace Prize by San Francisco legislators was withdrawn in 2001. Although gay, lesbian, and bisexual people may practice Falun Gong, founder Li stated that they must "give up the bad conduct" of all same-sex sexual activity.

In discussing the portrayal of Falun Gong as "anti-gay", Ethan Gutmann notes that Falun Gong's teachings are "essentially indistinguishable" from traditional religions such as Christianity, Islam, and Buddhism. Some journalists have also expressed concern over Falun Gong's teachings on the children of interracial marriages, and noted a belief in distinct heavens for people of different races. Concern stems from a statement of Li's identifying such children as products of "a chaotic situation brought about by mankind" indicative of "the Dharma-ending period". The Falun Dafa Information Center noted that this aspect of the practice's cosmology "in no way amounts to an endorsement of racial purity", adding that many Falun Gong practitioners have interracial children.

Opinions among scholars differ as to whether Falun Gong contains an apocalyptic message, and if so what the consequences of that are. Li situates his teaching of Falun Gong amidst the "Dharma-ending period" (末法), described in Buddhist scriptures as an era of moral decline when the teachings of Buddhism would need to be renewed.Benjamin Penny, "Falun Gong, Prophecy and Apocalypse", East Asian History, vol. 23, pp. 149-167. Richard Gunde, Assistant Director of the Center for Chinese Studies at UCLA, argues that Falun Gong is unlike western cults that fixate on death and Armageddon, but merely promises its followers a long and healthy life. "Falun Gong has a simple, innocuous ethical message," Gunde says, "and its leader, Li Hongzhi, despite his unusual, if not bizarre, statements, is in many ways simple and low key."

About aliens, Li claimed that extraterrestrial entities are actively intervening in human affairs. Li claimed that aliens developed and introduced the technology used by humans today. Li has denounced modern technology as part of an alien plot to undermine morality. Li believes that human inventions such as mechanical flight and electronic computers were given to humans by aliens.

References

External links
Listing of Falun Gong books available in PDF and DOC formats
Clearwisdom website (English version of Minghui.org)
Falun Gong. Considered an introductory exposition of the principles of Falun Gong and the concept of 'cultivation practice' along with descriptions of the exercises of Falun Gong. First published in April, 1993.
Nine Day Lectures on Falun Dafa. From 1992 to 1994, Li Hongzhi presented his teachings across China, the contents of which were ultimately edited and compiled into the book Zhuan Falun. The teachings entailed a one- to two-hour lecture on each of 8 to 10 consecutive days. Exercise instruction was offered thereafter. The final of these lecture series, delivered in Guangzhou, China, in 1994, were recorded live and they form a central part of Falun Gong's teachings.
Zhuan Falun-Turning the Law Wheel. Considered the central and most comprehensive exposition of the teachings of Falun Gong. First published in January, 1995.
Hong Yin  – Grand Verses''. A collection of short poems written by Li, often touching upon issues pertinent to the traditional Chinese concept of cultivation practice.
Lectures and Writings. Transcripts of Lectures delivered by Li and articles periodically published by him also form a central part of Falun Gong's teachings.

Falun Gong
1992 introductions